The Wildlife and Countryside Act 1981 is an Act of Parliament in the United Kingdom implemented to comply with European Council Directive 79/409/EEC on the conservation of wild birds. In short, the act gives protection to native species (especially those at threat), controls the release of non-native species, enhances the protection of Sites of Special Scientific Interest and builds upon the rights of way rules in the National Parks and Access to the Countryside Act 1949. The Act is split into 4 parts covering 74 sections; it also includes 17 schedules.

The legislation has strength; few amendments have been made to it, and it has acted as a foundation for later legislation to build upon. The compulsory 5 year review of schedules 5 and 8 make it dynamic in terms of the species which it protects.

History

Wild Birds Protection Act 1902

The Wild Birds Protection Act 1902 (2 Edw 7 c. 6) was an Act of Parliament of the Parliament of the United Kingdom, given the royal assent on 22 July 1902 and repealed in 1954.

It provided that where any person was convicted of an offence against the Wild Birds Protection Acts 1880 to 1896 (the 1880, 1881, 1894 and 1896 Acts), the court was empowered to dispose of any bird or bird's egg in respect of which the offence had been committed.

The Act was repealed and replaced by the Protection of Birds Act 1954. Bird Sanctuary Orders (BSOs) under this Act were replaced by Areas of Special Protection (AoSPs) under the Wildlife and Countryside Act 1981.

Birds Directive
The 1979 Bern Convention on the Conservation of European Wildlife and Natural Habitats covered the natural heritage of Europe, as well as in some African countries. It encouraged European co-operation in protecting natural habitats; and the conservation of flora and fauna, including migratory species and particularly endangered species.

The convention became open for signature on 19 September 1979 as a binding international legal instrument; it came into force on 1 June 1982. The UK ratified the convention and adopted the European Directive on the Conservation of Wild Birds (among other directives).

European Directive 79/409/EC on the Conservation of Wild Birds was adopted on 2 April 1979. The main provisions included: protection of vulnerable species; classification of Special Protection Areas, protection for all wild birds; and restrictions on killing/selling/keeping wild birds.

From 1981 several acts have passed as UK legislation to comply with the European Directive on the Conservation. The Wildlife and Countryside Act 1981 strengthened protection of SSSIs introduced by the National Parks and Access to the Countryside Act 1949. The pre-dated acts:
Protection of Birds Acts of 1954, 1964 and 1967
Conservation of Wild Creatures and Wild Plants Act 1975
were repealed by the passing of the Wildlife and Countryside Act 1981.

The Wildlife and Countryside Act 1981 came into force in 1982. In 1985 the UK ratified the Bonn Convention on the Conservation of Migratory Species of Wild Animals (1979). Adopted in Bonn, West Germany in 1979 and coming into force in 1985, the Bonn Convention worked to conserve migratory species and their habitats. Listed in Appendix I are species which are endangered, Appendix II contains species which would benefit from international cooperation.

Appendix 1 migratory species listed in the convention were amended into the Wildlife and Countryside Act 1981.

Further UK legislation to comply with the European Directive on the Conservation include:
Wildlife (Northern Ireland) Order 1985 (which contains broadly equivalent provisions to the 1981 Act in respect of Northern Ireland)
Nature Conservation and Amenity Lands Order 1985
Conservation Regulations 1995
Offshore Marine Conservation Regulations 2007
Conservation Regulations 2010

Overview

Part I: Wildlife 
Part I includes sections 1 to 27 of the Act.
The legislation contained in these sections covers:
 Protection of wild birds, their eggs and nests
 Protection of other animals
 Protection of plants
 Miscellaneous
 Introduction into the wild of species that are not native to Great Britain or are otherwise banned (Section 14): a list of affected animal and plant species was greatly expanded in the  Wildlife and Countryside Act 1981 (Variation of Schedule 9) (England and Wales) Order 2010
 The import or export of endangered species.

Part II: Nature Conservation, Countryside & National Parks 
Part II includes sections 28 to 52 of the Act.
The legislation contained in these sections covers:
 Nature conservation
 Sites of Special Scientific Interest
 Limestone pavements
 National nature reserves
 Marine nature reserves
 Countryside
 National parks

Part III: Public Rights of Way 
Part III includes sections 53 to 66 of the Act.
Building on the National Parks and Access to the Countryside Act 1949 which required local authorities to draw up maps defining public rights of way.

 Ascertainment of public rights of way
 The duties of government bodies to identify, maintain and update records about Public Rights of Way and to keep maps showing rights of way under continuous review.
 Updating and changing public rights of way
 Updating may be required after the following:
 diversion of a highway
 extension of a highway
 widening of a highway
 stopping of a highway
 addition of a highway
 removal of a highway
 change in position of public path or traffic byway
 implementation of restrictions to public right of way
 Rights of way are maintained at public expense.
 An up-to-date map act as evidence that the public has right of way in relevant way (i.e. by foot on footpaths or on horseback on bridleways).
 Changes of right of way requires a survey or review by the local surveying authority
 Miscellaneous & Supplemental
 Some responsibilities of owners of land crossed by a Public Right of Way
 Regulation of traffic on Public Rights of Way

Part IV: Miscellaneous & General 

Part IV includes sections 67 to 74 of the Act.
The legislation contained in these sections covers:
 Application of the Act to Crown land
 Application of the Act to the Isles of Scilly
 Offences by 'bodies corporate'
 Financial provisions
 Definitions
 "public path" means a footpath or bridleway.
 "footpath" allows the public to use highway on foot.
 "bridleway" allows the public to use highway on foot or bicycle, leading a horse or riding a horse.
 "byway open to all traffic" allows public to use highway for vehicles, on foot, leading a horse or riding a horse
 "recognised dairy breed" means Ayrshire, British Friesian, British Holstein, Dairy Shorthorn, Guernsey, Jersey and Kerry.
 "relevant conservation body" means Natural England or Countryside Council for Wales

Schedules 
The Act contains 17 schedules.

Schedules 1 to 10 relate to powers under the "Wildlife" part of the Act. Schedule 1 lists over forty species of birds that are protected by special penalties. Schedule 2 lists Huntable birds and their close seasons.
Schedules 11 to 13 relate to powers under Part II of the Act
Schedules 14 to 16 relate to powers under Part III of the Act
Schedule 17 lists previous legislation that was repealed in favour of this Act.

Amendments 
There have been a few simple amendments to the Wildlife and Countryside Act, such as word changes, increase in fines, etc. Every 5 years the JNCC coordinates a compulsory review of schedules 5 and 8 to add new species that may need protection.

A secretary of state can add or remove species at any time.

Main amendments to the Wildlife and Countryside Act 1981

1985: Makes it necessary for local authorities to use Countryside Commission guidelines in deciding whether area with natural beauty are important to conserve. Amendments were made to SSSI documentation, notification periods and maintenance of registers.
1991: Amendment making it an offence to knowingly cause or permit to cause actions listed in sections 5 and 11.
1995: Restricts licenses issued to control wild birds in order to reduce damage to crops, livestock, etc.
1998: Variation of schedules 5 and 8; for example, Flamingo Moss (Desmatodon cernuus) was added to schedule 8 as well as 17 other species.
1999: Variation of schedule 9; several species of deer were added to schedule 9.
2004: Minor amendments of various words.

Amendments from following legislation

1990: The Environmental Protection Act 1990 established English Nature and the Joint Nature Conservation Committee. JNCC made responsible for producing guidelines for SSSI selection.
1994: Conservation Regulations 1994. Built on Part I protecting habitats and species by implementing the requirement to assess plans/projects that will impact on European Protected Species.
2000: The Countryside and Rights of Way Act 2000 strengthened protection of SSSIs; by increased English Nature's enforcement power (allowed to combat neglect, prevent damaging activity, make public bodies responsible for conservation and enhancement of SSSIs) and increasing penalties for damage to a maximum of £20,000 per offence (along with court power to order restoration if damage occurs). Improved public rights of way giving people access to mountain, moor, heath, down and registered common land.
2006: The Natural Environment and Rural Communities Act 2006 merged English Nature and the Countryside Agency to create Natural England. Introduced new offences involving the intentional and reckless damage of SSSIs.
2009: The Marine and Coastal Access Act 2009 allowed the creation of marine conservation zones and with the consent of the secretary of state, the creation of SSSIs below mean low water mark.
2011: The Wildlife and Natural Environment (Scotland) Act 2011 made some major amendments with regard to control of non-native species, the protection of birds, protection of hares and rabbits and associated poaching.

Regulators

Regulated by Natural England

As well as being a regulator of the Wildlife and Countryside Act 1981, Natural England acts as an advisor (to individuals, companies, government, etc.) in relation to nature conservation. Additionally Natural England helps with land management through grants, projects and information.

Legally responsible for Sites of Special Scientific Interest (SSSIs) and enforce law when necessary. Damage, destruction or disturbance of SSSI habitats and features can lead to the following actions by Natural England:

information: awareness and education can stop harmful activities
warning letters: request harmful activity to stop and request agreement for restoration
formal investigations: collection of evidence by trained investigators following legal evidence requirements
cautions: if prosecution is not an appropriate action then a caution is issued if necessary evidence has been collected (to have a good chance of conviction)
prosecution: only occurs when evidence collected makes conviction reasonably certain or where prosecution is in the public interest. Natural England always try to recover costs and publicise prosecutions to the press. Specific penalties are applied, consideration of profit gained from offence is considered and often added to fines, application for a formal restoration order is made making the offender responsible for restoration of SSSI (at offender's expense).
civil action: in most serious cases where all other options have been explored, Natural England can take civil action to claim possession of SSSIs under serious threat.

Regulated by Natural Resources Wales and Scottish Natural Heritage

Similar responsibilities to Natural England, but responsible in Wales and Scotland, respectively.

Regulated by the police

Within the police there are several aspects to regulating wildlife crime; intelligence, enforcement and prevention.

The police are responsible for enforcing part I of the Wildlife and Countryside Act 1981, often advised by Natural England and will investigate wildlife offences; usually performed by wildlife crime officers (WCOs).

The National Wildlife Crime Unit (NWCU) is a law enforcement unit which helps agencies with enforcement. Wildlife crime investigations, statistics and intelligence are provided.

Regulated by the Environment Agency

The Environment Agency deal with reports from the public in relation to wildlife crime; under duties to prosecute environmental crimes, offences such as damage to habitats and wildlife are included. The EA work closely with the RSPB and wildlife crime officers.

Regulated by local authorities

Local authorities (e.g. Southampton City Council) are responsible for regulating public rights of way and enforcing rights of way legislation. Issues such as obstructions and misleading signs are usually reported by members of the public and then are dealt with by the local authority.

Monitored by

Regulatory bodies (mentioned above).
NGOs; the RSPB and RSPCA work with the police to prevent and identify wildlife crime.
General public.
The Partnership for Action against Wildlife Crime (PAW)- a multi-agency body which encourages both statutory and NGO organisations to work together in the combat of wildlife crime.

Offences

Land owners and occupiers

Failing to comply with the restrictions on methods to kill animals and birds (see Part I: Wildlife for further details).
Killing, injuring a wild bird or animal, damaging or destroying the nest/shelter of a wild bird or animal (see Part I: Wildlife for further details).
Removing any native plant (see Part I: Wildlife for further details).
Carrying out, causing or allowing operations likely to damage an SSSI without consent.
Failing to keep to a management notice.
Failing to let the national conservation body know about a change in ownership or occupation of land in an SSSI"
Failing to maintain public rights of way; removing obstructions, surfacing, maintaining safe and easy to use access points.

Public bodies/industry

Failing to comply with the restrictions on methods to kill animals and birds (see Part I: Wildlife for further details).
Killing, injuring a wild bird or animal, damaging or destroying the nest/shelter of a wild bird or animal (see Part I: Wildlife for further details).
Removing any native plant (see Part I: Wildlife for further details).
Release of non native species into the environment (see Part I: Wildlife for further details).
Carrying out or authorising operations likely to damage an SSSI without meeting the requirements to notify Natural England.
Failing to minimise any damage to an SSSI and if there is any damage, failing to restore it to its former state so far as is reasonably practical and possible."

Any person

Failing to comply with the restrictions on methods to kill animals and birds (see Part I: Wildlife for further details).
Killing, injuring a wild bird or animal, damaging or destroying the nest/shelter of a wild bird or animal (see Part I: Wildlife for further details).
Removing any native plant (see Part I: Wildlife for further details).
Intentionally or recklessly damaging, destroying or disturbing any of the habitats or features of an SSSI.
Intentionally or recklessly damaging, destroying, obscuring or taking down a site notice put up on land within an SSSI.
Preventing one of our officers lawfully accessing an SSSI."

Penalties 

Tried with regards to each separate animal/site involved. If multiple organisms or sites are involved then defendant tried per animal/site involved:

Up to £5,000 fine (incidents involving SSSIs can now incur fines of up to £20,000 under amendments made by the Countryside and Rights of Way Act 2000).
Up to six months imprisonment
If the defendant is a corporation then the head of that corporation may also be tried as liable and face the fine and/or prison sentence.

Exemptions

Exemptions to Part 1: Wildlife

There are various exemptions applied to part one providing protection for wildlife, thus no lawful act or offence will be committed, if:

an authorised person for example by obtaining a licence from Natural England or DEFRA kills or takes a wild bird, damages or destroys the nest of a bird and damages or removes eggs from the nest.
an authorised person for example has obtained a licence for killing or injuring an animal in schedule 5 and can provide sufficient evidence stating it was necessary to prevent damage and protect livestock, crops, vegetables, fruit, growing timber and fisheries.
a wild bird or animal has been taken if injured and that  person's intention is to tend and return the bird or animal to the wild when fully recovered. If it is so severely injured beyond recovery then it can be killed in the most humane way possible.

All sick and injured birds and animals which are being cared for must be registered with DEFRA.

it can be shown that the destruction of a nest, egg, bird, animal or an animal's shelter was accidental from a lawful operation and could not have been avoided.
an individual can provide evidence showing it was necessary to kill or injure a protected animal or bird in order to protect livestock, crops, vegetables, fruit, growing timber and fisheries.

Variations 

Provided below is a list - probably incomplete - of documents modifying the W&C Act 1981.

 Statutory Instrument 1988 No. 288: The Wildlife and Countryside Act 1981 (Variation of Schedules) Order 1988 S.I. 1981/288
 Statutory Instrument 1994 No. 1151: Wildlife and Countryside Act 1981 (Variation of Schedule 4) Order 1994 S.I. 1994/1151

References

Countryside Council for Wales, (2000). Farmer must work with CCW on damaged wildlife site, ccw.gov.uk. [Accessed: 27 March 2011].
Defra, (2007). Recent Prosecutions, defra.gov.uk. [Accessed: 24 March 2011].
Defra, (2009). Strategic Assessment, February 2009 Wildlife Crime in the UK (2009/2010), defra.gov.uk. [Accessed: 27 March 2011].
The Guardian, (2008). The Alien Invaders Choking Britains Waterways, guardian.co.uk. [Accessed 26 March 2011].
HMSO, (2005). Planning Policy Statement 9: Biodiversity and Geological Conservation, TSO, UK.
IEEM (Institute of Ecology and Environmental Management), (2010). National Wildlife Crime Unit, Role of the NWCU ieem.net. [Accessed: 27 March 2011].
Joint Nature and Conservation Committee, (2010a). Directive 2009/147/EC on the Conservation of Wild Birds, jncc.gov.uk. [Accessed: 22 February 2011].
Joint Nature and Conservation Committee, (2010b). The Convention on the Conservation of Migratory Species of Wild Animals, jncc.gov.uk. [Accessed: 27 February 2011].
National Archives, (2011). The Town and Country Planning (Environmental Impact Assessment) (England and Wales) Regulations 1999, N.O 293. legislation.gov.uk, [Accessed: 27 March 2011].
Naturenet, (2009a). Wildlife and Countryside Act 1981, naturenet.com. [Accessed: 26 February 2011].
Naturenet, (2009b). Site of Special Scientific Interest, naturenet.com. [Accessed: 27 February 2011].
Natural England, (2008). Important Environmental Case Concludes, naturalengland.org.uk [Accessed: 27 March 2011].
Natural England, (2009). Sites of Special Scientific Interest, English-nature.org.uk [Accessed: 27 March 2011].
Natural England, (2010). /regulation/wildlife/licences/default.aspx Licenses, naturalengland.org.uk. [Accessed: 27 February 2011].
Natural England, (2011). Standing Advice for Protected Species, naturalengland.org.uk. [Accessed: 26 March 2011].
Natural England, (2011b). What we do, naturalengland.org.uk. . [Accessed: 27 March 2011].
OPDM Circular (2005), 06/2005: Biodiversity and Geological Conservation, Statutory Obligations and their Impact within the Planning System, TSO, Uk.
RSPB, (2011). Wildlife and Countryside Act 1981, rspb.org.uk. [Accessed: 22 March 2011].
RSPB, (2011b). Sites of Special Scientific Interest, rspb.org.uk. [Accessed: 27 March 2011].

External links

United Kingdom Acts of Parliament 1981
Conservation in the United Kingdom
1981 in the environment
Rural society in the United Kingdom
Wildlife law in the United Kingdom
Birds in the United Kingdom
Wildlife law
Bird conservation
Environmental law in the United Kingdom